Kenji Kazama is a Japanese (martial artist). He played the henchman Spider  who fought Fred Williamson in the 1973 action film That Man Bolt and he played Yokohama  a mean and brutal Japanese official who fought Jhoon Rhee in the 1973 martial arts classic When Taekwondo Strikes. In 1974 he played the part of  Senkaku Kan in the Sonny Chiba cult classic The Street Fighter.

Background
Ken Kazama was born Minoru Tsutsui in Aichi Prefecture, Japan in 1943. He won the  Karate Championship in 1961 and won a Shorinji Kempo Championship in 1963. During the mid-1960s, he established at Shorinji Kempo Nagoya Chuo-doin school. He also established Shorinji Kempo Clubs at the Aichi Gakuin University and the Chukyo Joshi Tanki University. In the late 1960s, he won a middleweight kickboxing championship in South Korea. Also with Shinichi Chiba he founded the Japan Action Club (JAC).

Career
In When Taekwondo Strikes, a 1973 martial arts film that featured Jhoon Rhee, Angela Mao Ying, Carter Wong, Anne Winton and Sammo Hung, Kazama was cast as Yokohama. He had one of climactic fights with the hero's taking him on.
Kazama's role of Spider in That Man Bolt was that of a long time adversary to the main character, Bolt (Played by Fred Williamson) who takes him on in a fight. Following his role in the 1973 film, he was appearing the following year in Sonny Chiba's film, The Street Fighter. He also had another role in the film as action director. In the sequel to the film, Return of the Street Fighter, he was credited as kick boxing director. 
In 1976 he had the lead role in a film called Karate From Shaolin Temple which also featured Henry Yu Yung, Fung Ngai, Henry Yu Yung and Bill Lake.

Also in the 70s, Kazama recorded a song, "Forever Bruce Lee" and released on a 45 RPM single, Tam YT-1081.

Film Work

References

Info
 Kill devil info

External links
 Wikipedia Japan: Ken Kazama 
 Kong Kong Cinemagic:  Kenji Kazuma
 Kazuma Kenji HKMDB 風間健
  as Ken Kazama
  as Kenji Kazama
 YECLO.com: Ken Kazama
 少林寺拳法　ムサシ香港に現わる ''Karate from Shaolin Temple
 Budo.jp: Kazama Ken

Living people
Japanese male actors
Japanese male pop singers
Japanese male rock singers
Japanese male karateka
Japanese male kickboxers
1943 births